The Geneva Consensus Declaration on Promoting Women's Health and Strengthening the Family is an anti-abortion declaration cosponsored by the governments of Brazil, Egypt, Hungary, Indonesia, Uganda, and the United States. It was signed by 34 countries on October 22, 2020.

Document and history
Initiated by US Secretary of State Mike Pompeo, the document is not related to the United Nations' Geneva Consensus Foundation or to other Geneva-based institutions, and was not signed in Geneva.  Described as "Pompeo's project", the declaration was submitted by U.S. ambassador Kelly Craft to the UN General Assembly under agenda item 131 for December 2020. The U.S. position was that there is no "international right to abortion", and that the United Nations should therefore respect national laws and policies on the matter.

A commitment to prevent access to abortion, where that is the position of a nation's law, is central to the declaration.  The signatories of the Declaration "[r]eaffirm [inter alia] that there is no international right to abortion, nor any international obligation on the part of States to finance or facilitate abortion, consistent with the long-standing international consensus that each nation has the sovereign right to implement programs and activities consistent with their laws and policies ... ." Unlike some other international documents, the declaration is not legally binding.

Egyptian NGO Nazra described the declaration as "an international attack on women, gender, and sexuality", and Amnesty International USA said the signatories were "willingly endangering people's health and lives". Critics have accused the signatories of being motivated by a desire to undermine established international institutions. The Declaration's lack of legal effect has led to little change in Poland, where abortions, while now less common than in decades past, are still performed in around 25% of cases. In Belarus, some on the right, especially Belarusian Christian Democracy, have called for implementing the Declaration with more strict control of abortion, although the ruling party has done little to change the current situation. In both countries, abortion-on-demand is legal and fairly commonly practiced.

On January 28, 2021, U.S. president Joe Biden removed the United States from the declaration. The declaration was signed by Iván Duque of Colombia, but was withdrawn by Gustavo Petro shortly after taking office as president. On January 17, 2023, Brazil president Lula da Silva removed Brazil from the declaration.

Signatories
The declaration was signed by "ministers and high representatives of Governments" from Bahrain, Belarus, Benin, Burkina Faso, Cameroon, Democratic Republic of the Congo, Republic of the Congo, Djibouti, Egypt, Eswatini, Gambia, Georgia, Haiti, Hungary, Indonesia, Iraq, Kenya, Kuwait, Libya, Nauru, Niger, Oman, Pakistan, Paraguay, Poland, Saudi Arabia, Senegal, South Sudan, Sudan, Uganda, United Arab Emirates, and Zambia.

Criticism
Many note that most of the signatories are illiberal, authoritarian, or autocratic governments. They point out that the governments predominantly subscribe to hard-line religious viewpoints, and some of their leaders have been accused of human rights violations. While the declaration contains statements on women's rights and gender equality, most of the countries did not appear to take them seriously, and some are among the worst perpetrators of state-sanctioned oppression of women. Many of the countries have significant problems with rape, child marriage, and sexual slavery.

See also
 Commission on Unalienable Rights
 Foreign policy of the Donald Trump administration
 Foreign policy of the Joe Biden administration
 Mexico City Policy

References

External links
Geneva Consensus Declaration on Promoting Women's Health and Strengthening the Family as filed with the United Nations

Human rights instruments
2020 documents
October 2020 events
History of human rights
Global ethics
Women's rights